M.J.D. "Rianne" Donders-de Leest (born 22 July 1960, in Eindhoven) is a Dutch politician for the Christian Democratic Appeal (CDA).

Donders-de Leest started her career as a teacher at a primary school. She was elected into the municipal council of Etten-Leur in 1990. Till 2002 she was a councillor, among others as leader of the CDA fraction. In 2000 she also became an alderman, dealing with spatial planning, traffic, transportation, housing and sports.

From 1 September 2004 to 9 January 2015 she was mayor of the municipality of Geldrop-Mierlo. Since 30 January 2015 she has been mayor of Roermond.

References 
 Equivalent article on the Dutch Wikipedia.

1960 births
Living people
Aldermen in North Brabant
Christian Democratic Appeal politicians
Dutch educators
Dutch women educators
Mayors in North Brabant
People from Geldrop-Mierlo
Mayors in Limburg (Netherlands)
People from Roermond
Municipal councillors in North Brabant
People from Eindhoven
Women mayors of places in the Netherlands